Ivan Marconi (born 25 October 1989) is an Italian professional footballer who plays as a centre-back for Italian  club Palermo.

Club career

Early career
Born in Brescia, Lombardy, Marconi started his career with Internazionale. In 2006–07 season, he was awarded no.41 shirt of the first team as a member of Primavera team. In mid-2007, he was transferred to Lumezzane for free but loaned to Brescia on 31 August 2007. In the next season he was signed by Sampdoria youth team. Marconi received a call-up from the first team on 20 January 2009.

Gubbio
In January 2009 he was sold to Gubbio from Lumezzane in co-ownership deal, which he played  seasons, mainly as central defender. In June 2010, Gubbio and Lumezzane failed to agree price for the remain 50% registration rights and the rights had to decide by closed tender between the two clubs. On 30 June 2010, the closed tender was opened on Lega Pro and Lumezzane won the tender by a higher price.

Savona
In August 2010, he was loaned to Savona with option to sign him in co-ownership deal from Lumezzane. On 23 June 2011 Savona excised the option. In June 2012 Savona acquired him outright.

Cremonese
On 7 July 2015 Marconi was signed by Cremonese.

Monza
On 5 January 2019, he joined Monza.

Palermo
On 20 August 2020, Marconi moved to Serie C club Palermo. He was a protagonist of the club's successful 2021–22 Serie C campaign that saw the Rosanero winning the promotion playoffs, becoming a fan favourite also thanks to his iconic bicycle kick save in the first leg of the playoff final against Padova. After being confirmed for the club's 2022–23 Serie B campaign, Marconi also proved to be a valid player at the second division level, scoring three goals during the first half of the season.

Career statistics

Club

Honours

Club 
Monza
 Serie C Group A: 2019–20
Palermo

 Serie C Playoff Winner: 2021–22

References

External links
 
 Football.it Profile 

1989 births
Living people
Footballers from Brescia
Italian footballers
Association football central defenders
F.C. Lumezzane V.G.Z. A.S.D. players
U.C. Sampdoria players
A.S. Gubbio 1910 players
Savona F.B.C. players
U.S. Cremonese players
A.C. Monza players
Palermo F.C. players
Serie B players
Serie C players